Lok Bhalai Party (LBP) is a defunct Indian regional political party active mainly in Punjab. It was founded by former Union Minister Balwant Singh Ramoowalia in 1999. It merged into Akali Dal (Badal) in November 2011. Later it was relaunched in July 2018.

Objectives 
The party mainly focused in the issues related to Punjabis migrating to other countries. In that respect, in that respect it took up causes of people duped by travel agents, issues related to wedding of Punjabi girls with Non-resident Indian

See also 
 Political parties of India
 Politics of India
 Dalit Kisan Dal

References

External links
 B.S. Ramoowalia

Defunct political parties in Punjab, India
1999 establishments in Punjab, India
Political parties established in 1999
Political parties disestablished in 2011